Friedrich-Baur-Preis was a literary prize of Germany from 1990 to 2017.

Prize categories
 Fine arts
 Literature
 Music
 Performing arts
 Film and media art

External links
 

German literary awards